Tsuneari Yahiro (born 12 September 1987) is an Australian karateka.

Career 

He is a four time Oceania karate champion, winning over 3 categories of 60kg, 67kg and 75kg.

At the 2010 World combat games held in Beijing, China, he won the bronze medal in the men’s kumite 60kg event.

At the 2013 World Games held in Cali, Colombia, he won the bronze medal in the men's kumite 67 kg event. In 2017, he competed in the men's 67 kg event at the 2017 World Games held in Wrocław, Poland. He drew one match and lost two matches in the elimination round and he did not advance to compete in the semi-finals.

He represented Australia at the 2020 Summer Olympics in Tokyo, Japan. He competed in the men's 75 kg event. He was beaten by all four of his opponents in the group stage and therefore did not compete for a medal.

In 2021, he competed at the World Olympic Qualification Tournament held in Paris, France hoping to qualify for the 2020 Summer Olympics in Tokyo, Japan. He did not qualify at this tournament due to dislocating his shoulder but he was able to qualify via continental representation soon after. He competed in the men's 75 kg event where he did not advance to compete in the semifinals.

Achievements

References

External links 
 
 

1987 births
Living people
Australian male karateka
Competitors at the 2013 World Games
Competitors at the 2017 World Games
World Games bronze medalists
World Games medalists in karate
Karateka at the 2020 Summer Olympics
Olympic karateka of Australia
21st-century Australian people